Perdika (Greek: Πέρδικα) is a village and a former community in Thesprotia, Epirus, Greece. Since the 2011 local government reform it is part of the municipality Igoumenitsa, of which it is a municipal unit. The municipal unit has an area of 34.605 km2.

Perdika is located 29 miles southeast of Igoumenitsa. The town's population is 1,613 as of the 2011 population census. Primary aspects of the economy are agriculture and tourism.

References

Populated places in Thesprotia